Borja Granero Niñerola (born 30 June 1990) is a Spanish footballer who plays for CD Castellón as either a central defender or a defensive midfielder.

Club career
Born in Valencia, Granero finished his development at local giants Valencia CF. He made his senior debut with neighbouring Villajoyosa CF in the 2009–10 season, suffering relegation from Segunda División B.

In late January 2011, after returning to the Che, with the reserves in Tercera División, Granero was sold to Recreativo de Huelva of the Segunda División. He made his official debut for his new club on 29 May in a 2–0 away loss against Villarreal CF B, one of only two league appearances during the campaign.

On 30 July 2013, after being rarely used, Granero signed with Racing de Santander, recently relegated to the third division. A regular starter, he achieved promotion to the second tier in his first season but was relegated in the second.

Granero returned to division two on 24 July 2018, after agreeing to a contract with Extremadura UD. On 3 September 2020, after suffering relegation, he signed a three-year deal with Deportivo de La Coruña who also went down.

Personal life
Granero's father, José Carlos, was also a footballer. He too was groomed at Valencia.

Career statistics

Club

References

External links

1990 births
Living people
Spanish footballers
Footballers from Valencia (city)
Association football defenders
Association football midfielders
Segunda División players
Segunda División B players
Tercera División players
Primera Federación players
Valencia CF Mestalla footballers
Villajoyosa CF footballers
Recreativo de Huelva players
Racing de Santander players
Extremadura UD footballers
Deportivo de La Coruña players
CD Castellón footballers